The 1935 Liverpool Wavertree by-election was a by-election held in England for the House of Commons constituency of Liverpool Wavertree on 6 February 1935.  It was won by the Labour Party candidate Joseph Cleary.

Vacancy 
The seat had become vacant when the sitting Conservative Member of Parliament (MP), Ronald Nall-Cain had succeeded to the peerage as Baron Brocket. He had held the seat since a by-election in 1931.

Electoral history

Candidates 
The Conservative candidate was James Platt, but Randolph Churchill (son of the future Prime Minister Winston Churchill) stood as an "independent Conservative". The Labour Party candidate was 32-year-old Joseph Cleary, a local magistrate.

The Liberal Party selected 49 year-old Liverpool solicitor, Tudor Artro Morris as their candidate. Morris had contested Wallasey for the Liberals at the 1922 and 1923 general elections. He was educated at the Liverpool Institute and Liverpool University.

Result 
With the Conservative vote split between the official candidate and the independent Churchill, the result was a victory for the Labour candidate, Joseph Jackson Cleary, who took the seat on a swing of 30%.

Aftermath 
Cleary was unseated at the 1935 general election by the Conservative Peter Shaw, who held the seat until he stood down at the 1945 general election.

See also
Liverpool Wavertree (UK Parliament constituency)
1931 Liverpool Wavertree by-election
List of United Kingdom by-elections
United Kingdom by-election records

Sources 

1935 elections in the United Kingdom
1935 in England
1930s in Liverpool
Wavertree, 1935
February 1935 events